Henschel's Hs 132 was a World War II dive bomber and interceptor aircraft of the German Luftwaffe that never saw service. The unorthodox design featured a top-mounted BMW 003 jet engine (identical in terms of make and position to the powerplant used by the Heinkel He 162) and the pilot in a prone position. The Soviet Army occupied the factory just as the Hs 132 V1 was nearing flight testing, the V2 and V3 being 80% and 75% completed.

Design and development
There had been interest in the idea of a prone pilot for combat aircraft to reduce the effect of g-forces during maneuvering. Several aircraft had already experimented with this layout for various reasons, the Horten IIIf had a prone pilot, but this was primarily to reduce drag in this high-performance glider, while the DFS 228 reconnaissance glider also used a prone pilot to make it easier to seal its pressurized cabin. It was not until the Berlin B9 was built specifically to test this arrangement for improved g-load that any serious effort toward development could be carried out.

Starting in early 1943, the Berlin B9 twin-piston engined experimental aircraft demonstrated that it was indeed possible for a pilot to fly the aircraft lying down, and that it did improve his ability to handle high loads. The pilot had an extremely restricted field of view upward or to the rear that made it suitable only for certain roles, including bombers or fighters or interceptors with a major speed advantage over their opposition.

Based on this research, several late-war German designs followed the B9's lead and used a prone pilot. Better g-load performance was not the only reason, however, as this layout also reduced the frontal area of the aircraft. This was a serious concern for interceptors attacking the USAAF's B-17 Flying Fortress, as calculations showed that the chance of being hit by its defensive guns was largely a function of frontal area.

The genesis for the Hs 132 was an 18 February 1943 specification published by the German Air Ministry (RLM) calling for a single-seat shipping attack aircraft to counter an expected invasion of Europe. A piston-engined aircraft was called for at the time, but the performance requirements led to a switch to jet power. Henschel submitted their design for RLM approval in April/May 1944, by which point they had already started wind tunnel testing the basic layout. The aircraft that emerged had a roughly cigar-shaped fuselage with short-span mid-set wings and a horizontal stabilizer with considerable dihedral ending in twin rounded-front vertical stabilizers.

The BMW 003 engine was mounted on the back of the aircraft above the wing, likely to make servicing easier due to the low ground height of the aircraft that put the engine roughly shoulder-height. The sharply dihedraled 'butterfly'-like twin rudder arrangement kept the tail surfaces clear of the jet efflux. The cockpit was completely faired into the fuselage contour, with a rounded clear nose-cone on the front of the aircraft. Behind this was the actual "window," a large armored-glass plate located some distance behind the extreme nose; the glazing extended almost to the wing root. The design in terms of engine mounting and tailplane bore a very strong resemblance to the contemporary Volksjäger ("people's fighter") design competition winner, the Heinkel He 162 Spatz (sparrow). The basic A model carried one  bomb; it had no other armament. The aircraft was designed to withstand 12 g during pullout. The computerized bombsight was not delivered in time to be fitted to the aircraft.

Several other versions of the basic airframe were proposed as well. The Hs 132B used the Junkers Jumo 004 engine in place of the BMW 003, and added two  MG 151/20 cannons. The HS 132C was a more extensively modified version intended for bomber interception, featuring the larger Heinkel HeS 011 engine, two  151/20s and two  MK 103 or MK 108 cannons.  The HeS 011, intended to power a wide variety of new and existing Luftwaffe aircraft (an example of the latter being the proposed D and P series of the Arado Ar 234 jet bomber), was still in the pre-production phase when the war ended.  It was hoped that by the time the HS 132B became available, the Panzerblitz anti-tank missile would be in production and available for use. The Hs 132D included a new wing of increased span. A contract for six prototypes was approved in May 1944, and construction was begun in March 1945. Hs 132V1 was scheduled to have its first flight in June 1945, but the completed wings and fuselage were never mated, and Soviet forces captured the intact fuselage in May 1945 while the wings were never moved from their factory in France.

Variants
 Hs 132A Dive bomber
 BMW 003 turbojet engine, 1 × 500 kg (1,100 lb) bomb
 Hs 132B Dive bomber/Anti-tank plane
 Jumo 004 turbojet engine, 1 × 500 kg (1,102 lb) bomb, 2 × 20 mm MG 151 cannon, and/or six or eight Panzerblitz anti-tank rockets
 Hs 132C Dive bomber
 He S 011 turbojet engine, 1 × 500 kg (1,100 lb) bomb, 2 × 20 mm MG 151 cannon and 2 × 30 mm (1.2 in) MK 103 cannon 
 Hs 132D
 Increased wingspan variant

Specifications (Hs 132A)

See also

References
Notes

Bibliography

 Green, William. Warplanes of the Third Reich. London: Macdonald and Jane's Publishers Ltd., 1970 (fourth impression 1979). .
 Smith, J.Richard and Kay, Anthony. German Aircraft of the Second World War. London: Putnam & Company Ltd., 1972 (third impression 1978). .
 Wood, Tony and Gunston, Bill. Hitler's Luftwaffe: A pictorial history and technical encyclopedia of Hitler's air power in World War II. London: Salamander Books Ltd., 1977. .

External links

 Proned pilots
 Hamza Fouatih's Hs132 artwork

1940s German bomber aircraft
Hs 132
Prone pilot aircraft
World War II jet aircraft of Germany
World War II dive bombers
Single-engined jet aircraft